This is a list of division winners and playoff matches in the regionally organized Eccellenza 2007–2008, which is the 6th level of Italian football.  A total of 36 teams are promoted to Serie D for the 2008–09 season. The first-placed team from each of the 28 divisions is promoted directly. The seven winners of the national playoffs are also promoted.  Finally, the 36th spot is reserved for the winner of the Coppa Italia Dilettanti.  This year, the winner was Hinterreggio, which also won direct promotion as divisional winner in the region of Calabria, thus Pro Settimo & Eureka won promotion as Coppa Italia Dilettanti runners-up.

Division winners

Regional playoffs
A number of playoff tournaments were organized by some Regional Committees in order to choose a team for each of the Eccellenza rounds.

The following Regional Committees decided instead not to organize regional playoffs, instead choosing to directly appoint regular season runners-up for the national playoffs:

Trentino-Alto Adige/Südtirol: Brixen
Veneto: Albignasego (A), Edo Mestre (B)
Friuli-Venezia Giulia: Manzanese
Lazio: Aprilia (A), Boville Ernica (B)
Abruzzo: Casoli

Piedmont & Valle d'Aosta
Girone A

Playoff finals

|}

Girone B

Playoff semifinals

|}
Playoff finals

|}

Lombardy
Girone A

Playoff semifinals

|}

Playoff finals

|}

Girone B

Playoff semifinals

|}

Playoff finals

|}

Girone C

Playoff semifinals

|}

Playoff finals

|}

Tuscany
Girone A

Playoff semifinals

|}

Playoff finals

|}

Girone B

Playoff semifinals

|}

Playoff finals

|}

Emilia-Romagna
Girone A

Playoff semifinals

|}

Playoff finals

|}

Girone B

Playoff semifinals

|}

Playoff finals

|}

Marche

Playoff semifinals

|}

Playoff finals

|}

Umbria

Playoff semifinals

|}

Playoff finals

|}

Molise

Playoff semifinals

|}

Playoff finals

|}

Campania
Girone A

Playoff semifinals

|}

Playoff finals

|}

Girone B

Playoff semifinals

|}

Playoff finals

|}

Apulia

Playoff semifinals

|}

Playoff finals

|}

Basilicata

Playoff semifinals

|}

Playoff finals

|}

Calabria

Playoff semifinals

|}

Playoff finals

|}

Sicily
Girone A

Playoff semifinals

|}

Playoff finals

|}

Girone B

Playoff semifinals

|}

Playoff finals

|}

Sardinia

Playoff semifinals

|}

Playoff finals

|}

Notes
(ag) — Qualified through away goals rule.
(b) — Qualified as best-placed team in regular season.

National playoffs

Rules
The national playoffs involved a total of 28 teams, respectively the regional playoff winners or the second-placed teams in case regional playoffs were not organized by the correspondent committee. A total of two two-legged rounds are played in order to fill the remaining seven Serie D spots.

First round
Played on May 25 and June 1

|}

Second round
Played on June 8 and 15

|}

Notes and references

6
2008